"The Silver Whistle" was an American television play broadcast live on December 24, 1959, as part of the CBS television series, Playhouse 90.  It was the seventh episode of the fourth season of Playhouse 90 and the 124th episode overall.

Plot
The play concerns a charming vagabond who arrives at an old people's home and brings new life to the home's residents.

Production
Franklin Schaffner was the director, and Robert McEnroe wrote the teleplay based on his stage play, The Silver Whistle.

The cast included Eddie Albert as the charming vagabond, Arthur Hughes as an "old man with young ideas", Joseph Sweeney as a "more conservative companion", Doro Merande as a "prophet of doom", Margaret Hamilton as an "elderly tippler", Enid Markey as a "kittenish spinster", Henry Jones as a "philosophizing hobo", and additional performances by Bethel Leslie, Harry Townes, and Zamah Cunningham.

Reception
The production received a positive review from the New York Daily News which cited the story's "human qualities" and the "appealing performances of Albert, Jones, Leslie, and Merande. Percy Shain of The Boston Globe gave the production a poor review, citing "an incredible story line", "dubious dialogue", and a "distasteful" willingness to ridicule the "foibles" of the elderly.

References

1959 American television episodes
Playhouse 90 (season 4) episodes
1959 television plays